Kombai (Komboy) is a Papuan language of Boven Digoel Regency in Indonesian New Guinea. It is spoken by the Kombai people. Tayan is a dialect.

Ethnologue records a Wanggom language which is similar to Kombai. However, this has not been attested as a distinct language.

References

Hughes, Jock. 2009. Upper Digul Survey. SIL International.

Languages of western New Guinea
Awyu–Dumut languages